is a Japanese developer of video games, based in Tsukishima, Tokyo.

By far Artdink's biggest international success was the award-winning A-Train (known in Japan as A Ressha de Ikou, or "Take the A-Train") strategy game released for the PC and Amiga, which was published by SimCity creators Maxis. A Family Computer and MSX versions were also released, both exclusively in Japan. Artdink have released several sequels to this game, the most recent being A-Train All Aboard! Tourism for Nintendo Switch.

A few other Artdink titles have seen US and PAL release from various publishers, including Aquanaut's Holiday (Sony), Carnage Heart (Sony), Turnabout (Natsume/Zoo Digital), Tail of the Sun (Sony), AIV Global: Evolution (Sony) and No One Can Stop Mr. Domino! (Acclaim/JVC Music Europe) for the PlayStation. None of these titles have achieved mainstream success due to their unconventional nature.

The European publisher Midas Interactive obtained the rights to some of Artdink's PlayStation 2 games and published versions localised in English and other languages in PAL countries. Games released by Midas include Golful Golf (Mr. Golf), The Seed, Buchigire Kongou (Battle Construction Vehicles), and A Ressha de Ikou 6 (A-Train 6).

Games
1988–1989
A-Ressha de Ikou II (X68000)
A-Ressha de Ikou II: Shin Map (X68000)
Double Eagle (X68000)
Double Eagle: Tricky Hole (X68000)
How Many Robot (PC88, MSX, X68000)
Daikairei: Dai Nippon Teikoku Kaigun no Kiseki (X68000)
Daikairei: Nankai to Shitou (X68000)
Daikairei: Power Kit to Shin Scenario Make Kit (X68000)
Railroad Empire (PC)

1990–1999
A-Ressha de Ikou II: Gentei Okaidoku Han (X68000)
Daikairei: Dai Nippon Teikoku Gentei Okaidokuban (X68000)
Daikairei: Nankai no Shitou Gentei Okaidokuban (X68000)
Daikairei: Nankai no Shitou Tsuika Scenario (X68000)
Daikairei: Tsuika Scenario (X68000)
Eikan wa Kimi ni: Koukou Yakyuu Zenkoku Taikai (X68000)
Far Side Moon: Chikyuu Boueidan 2 (X68000)
Kikou Shidan (X68000)
A-Ressha de Ikou (Famicom)
A-Ressha de Ikou III (X68000, PC Engine, Super Famicom)
A-Ressha de Ikou III Map Construction (X68000)
A-Ressha de Ikou III Map Construction Shin Map Tsuki (X68000)
The Atlas (PC-9801)
The Atlas HD Senyou Ban (PC-9801)
The Atlas 2 (PC-9801)
A-Ressha de Ikou IV (PC-9801, PlayStation)
The Atlas: Renaissance Voyager (PC Engine)
Eikan wa Kimi ni: Koukou Yakyuu Zenkoku Taikai (PC Engine)
The Atlas (Super Famicom)
Lunatic Dawn FX (PC-FX)
Aquanaut's Holiday (PlayStation)
Tail of the Sun (PlayStation)
ToPoLo (PlayStation)
A-Ressha de Ikou V (PlayStation)
A-Train (PlayStation)
A-Ressha de Ikou Z: Mezase! Tairiku Oudan (PlayStation)
C.E.O. (PC)
Carnage Heart (PlayStation)
Carnage Heart EZ: Easy Zapping (PlayStation)
Kaze no Notam (PlayStation)
Kowloon's Gate (PlayStation)
Colony Wars (PlayStation)
The Conveni Special (PlayStation)
The FamiRes (PlayStation)
Lunatic Dawn III (PlayStation)
Navit (PlayStation)
Neo Atlas (PlayStation)
No One Can Stop Mr. Domino! (PlayStation)
Ogre Battle: The March of the Black Queen (PlayStation)
SimCity 2000 (PlayStation)
Susume! Kaizoku (PlayStation)
Zeus: Carnage Heart Second (PlayStation)
Vampire: Kyuuketsuki Densetsu (PlayStation)
Aquanaut no Kyuujitsu: Memories of Summer 1996 (PlayStation)
A-Ressha de Ikou Z: Mezase! Tairiku Oudan (PlayStation)
Aquanaut no Kyuujitsu 2 (PlayStation)
Eikan wa Kimi ni 4 (PlayStation)
Neo Atlas II (PlayStation)
Zeus II: Carnage Heart (PlayStation)
Lunatic Dawn Odyssey (PlayStation)
Tactics Ogre: Let Us Cling Together (PlayStation)

2000–2009
A-Train 6 (PlayStation 2)
Turnabout (PlayStation)
BCV: Battle Construction Vehicles (PlayStation 2)
Lagnacure Legend (PlayStation)
Eikan wa Kimi ni: Koushien e no Michi (PlayStation 2)
Mahjong Gokuu Taisei (PlayStation 2)
Neo Atlas III (PlayStation 2)
Lunatic Dawn Tempest (PlayStation 2)
A-Ressha de Ikou 2001 (PlayStation 2)
Basic Studio: Powerful Game Koubou (PlayStation 2)
Mr. Golf (PlayStation 2)
Train Kit for A-Ressha de Ikou 2001 (PlayStation 2)
Shenseiki Evangelion Typing E-Keikaku (PlayStation 2)
Eikan wa Kimi ni: Koushien no Hasha (PlayStation 2)
Gendai Yougo no Kiso Chishiki 2001 (PlayStation 2)
Katei no Igaku TV Ware Series (PlayStation 2)
The Seed: WarZone (PlayStation 2)
Nihongo Daijiten (PlayStation 2)
Pro Atlas for TV: Zengokuban (PlayStation 2)
Pro Atlas for TV: Kinki (PlayStation 2)
Pro Atlas for TV: Shutoken (PlayStation 2)
Pro Atlas for TV: Toukai (PlayStation 2)
A-Ressha de Ikou 2001 Perfect Set (PlayStation 2)
Motto Golful Golf (PlayStation 2)
The FamiRes (PlayStation)
Eikan wa Kimi ni 2004: Koushien no Kodou (PlayStation 2)
Gundam Battle Tactics (PlayStation Portable)
Zipang (PlayStation 2)
A-Train HX (Xbox 360)
Carnage Hearts Portable (PlayStation Portable)
Gundam Battle Royale (PlayStation Portable)
Lisa to Issho ni Tairiku Oudan: A-Ressha de Ikou (PlayStation Portable)
Gundam Battle Chronicle (PlayStation Portable)
Aquanaut's Holiday: Kakusareta Kiroku (PlayStation 3)
Macross Ace Frontier (PlayStation Portable)
Souykuu no Fafner: Dead Aggressor (PlayStation Portable)A-Ressha de Ikou DS (Nintendo DS)Gundam Battle Universe (PlayStation Portable)Macross Ultimate Frontier (PlayStation Portable)

2010A-Ressho de Ikou DS: Navigation Pack (Nintendo DS)A-Train 9 (PC)Carnage Heart EXA (PlayStation Portable)Gundam Assault Survive (PlayStation Portable)Tantei Opera Milky HolmesMacross Trial Frontier (PlayStation 3)
Included with the movie Macross Frontier: The False Songstress in a hybrid Blu-ray Disc.
2011Macross Triangle Frontier (PlayStation Portable)Macross Last Frontier (PlayStation 3)
Included with the movie Macross Frontier: The Wings of Goodbye in a hybrid Blu-ray Disc.

2012A-Ressha de Ikou 3D (Nintendo 3DS)Bipedal Movement Simulation (PlayStation 3)Gundam Seed Battle Destiny (PlayStation Vita)Tantei Opera Milky Holmes 2Macross: My Boyfriend is a Pilot 2012 (PlayStation 3)
Included with the movie Macross: Do You Remember Love? in a hybrid Blu-ray Disc.

2013Battle Robot Damashii (PlayStation Portable)Macross 30: Voices across the Galaxy (PlayStation 3)Dragon Ball Z: Battle of Z (PlayStation 3, PlayStation Vita, Xbox 360)Puella Magi Madoka Magica: The Battle Pentagram (PlayStation Vita)

2014A-Train 3D: City Simulator (Nintendo 3DS)

2015Sword Art Online: Lost Song (PlayStation Vita, PlayStation 3, PlayStation 4)World Trigger: Borderless Mission (PlayStation Vita)

2016Macross Delta Scramble (PlayStation Vita)Neo Atlas 1469 (PlayStation Vita, Windows)A-Ressha de Ikou 3D NEO (Nintendo 3DS)A-Train PC Classic (Windows)

2017A-Train Express (PlayStation 4)Accel World vs. Sword Art Online: Millennium Twilight (PlayStation 4, PlayStation Vita, Windows)

2018Neo Atlas 1469 (Nintendo Switch)

2019A-Ressha de Ikou Exp. + (PlayStation 4)Sword Art Online: Lost Song (Windows)

2020Witch Spring 3 Re:Fine -The Story of the Marionette Witch Eirudy (Nintendo Switch)

2021A-Train: All Aboard! Tourism (Nintendo Switch, Windows)Wonder Boy: Asha in Monster World (Nintendo Switch, PlayStation 4)

2022Triangle Strategy (Nintendo Switch)Soul Hackers 2 (Windows, Xbox One)SD Gundam Battle Alliance'' (Nintendo Switch, PlayStation 4, PlayStation 5, Windows, Xbox One, Xbox Series X/S)

References

External links
Artdink

Artdink company page at GameFAQs

Video game companies of Japan
Video game development companies
Video game companies established in 1986
Japanese companies established in 1986
Software companies based in Tokyo